Kivijärvi is a Finnish surname. Notable people with the surname include:

 Harry Kivijärvi (1931–2010), Finnish sculptor
 Kåre Kivijärvi (1938–1991), Norwegian photographer

Finnish-language surnames